The Light of Heart is a 1940 play by the British writer Emlyn Williams.

It ran for 127 performances at the Apollo Theatre in London's West End between 21 February and 8 June 1940. The cast included Godfrey Tearle, Megs Jenkins, Gladys Henson, Elliott Mason and Angela Baddeley. It later ran for 55 performances at the Guild Theatre on Broadway.

Adaptations
In 1942 it was adapted into the Hollywood film Life Begins at Eight-Thirty directed by Irving Pichel and starring Monty Woolley, Ida Lupino and Cornel Wilde. Twenty years later it was made into a West German film Life Begins at Eight starring Johanna Matz.

References

Bibliography
 Goble, Alan. The Complete Index to Literary Sources in Film. Walter de Gruyter, 1999.
 Wearing, J.P. The London Stage 1940-1949: A Calendar of Productions, Performers, and Personnel.  Rowman & Littlefield, 2014.

1940 plays
Plays by Emlyn Williams
British plays adapted into films
West End plays
Plays set in London